Parangcho, also known as Dingyan Islet, is a disputed submerged reef about 4.5 km from Socotra Rock in the Yellow Sea.

In 1999, the reef was named Dingyan Islet by China.

In 2006, it was named Parangcho by the South Korean government. The South Korean Ministry of Maritime Affairs and Fisheries has stated that it will seek to register the reef's name with global organizations and for maps.

See also
East China Sea EEZ disputes
Foreign relations of the People's Republic of China
Foreign relations of the Republic of Korea
Liancourt Rocks
Parangdo (disambiguation)
Senkaku Islands dispute
Socotra Rock

References

Reefs
Geography of South Korea